Pegasus Market is a 2019 South Korean television series based on Kim Gyu-sam's webtoon of the same name, starring Kim Byung-chul and Lee Dong-hwi. It aired on tvN every Friday at 23:00 (KST) from September 20 to December 6, 2019.

Synopsis
Pegasus Market, where Moon Seok-goo works as a manager, is in bad shape. Jeong Bok-dong is soon appointed as the new CEO after being demoted within Daema Group. Seok-goo becomes hopeful concerning the market's future, not knowing what Bok-dong's true intentions are: sinking the company in order to take revenge on Daema Group. His plan, however, takes an unexpected turn.

Cast

Main
 Kim Byung-chul as Jeong Bok-dong
 Lee Dong-hwi as Moon Seok-goo

Supporting

People at Pegasus Market
 Jung Hye-sung as Jo Mi-ran
 Jung Min-sung as Choi Il-nam
 Kang Hong-seok as Oh In-bae
 Kim Ho-young as Jo Min-dal
 Kim Gyoo-ri as Go Mi-joo

Daema Group
 Lee Soon-jae as Kim Dae-ma
 Park Ho-san as Kwon Young-goo
 Lee Gyu-hyun as Kim Gap
 Choi Ro-woon as young Kim Gap
 Bae Jae-won as Park Il-woong

Others
 Yeonwoo as Kwon Ji-na, as Kwon Young-goo's daughter and an Intern at Pegasus Market. She forms a rivaling relationship with Jo Mi-ran over Moon Seok-goo. (Ep.10, 12)
 Park Doo-shik as Gangster boss	
 Cho Seung-hee

Special appearances
 Woo Hyun as Kim Chi-ah (Ep. 1)
 Kim Yeon-ja as herself (Ep. 1)
 Lee Eung-kyung as Seok-goo's mother (Ep. 1)
 Lee Eugene as Sang-tae, Bok-dong's son (Ep. 1, 4)
 Lee Hyun-wook as DM Group psychiatrist (Ep. 10)

Original soundtrack

Part 1

Part 2

Viewership

Spin-off web series
A spin-off web series entitled Vroom Vroom Pegasus Market premiered on December 13, 2019 on tvN D STORY YouTube channel. It tells the story of Moon Seok-goo (Lee Dong-hwi), Oh In-bae (Kang Hong-seok) and Pielleggu (Choi Kwang-je) who team up in order to steal secrets from their competitor.

Awards and nominations

References

External links
  
 
 

TVN (South Korean TV channel) television dramas
2019 South Korean television series debuts
2019 South Korean television series endings
Korean-language television shows
Television shows based on South Korean webtoons
Television series set in shops
Workplace comedy television series
South Korean comedy-drama television series
South Korean workplace television series
Television shows set in Gyeonggi Province
Television series by Studio N (Naver)